Some Hearts Are Diamonds is the second solo album by Chris Norman, released in 1986 by Hansa Records. Dieter Bohlen, formerly of Modern Talking, produced the album and wrote several of the songs.

The lead single, "Midnight Lady", was a number one hit throughout much of Europe.

Track listing

Charts

References 

1986 albums
Chris Norman albums
Hansa Records albums